The meridian 51° west of Greenwich is a line of longitude that extends from the North Pole across the Arctic Ocean, Greenland, the Atlantic Ocean, South America, the Southern Ocean, and Antarctica to the South Pole.

The 51st meridian west forms a great circle with the 129th meridian east.

From Pole to Pole
Starting at the North Pole and heading south to the South Pole, the 51st meridian west passes through:

{| class="wikitable plainrowheaders"
! scope="col" width="120" | Co-ordinates
! scope="col" | Country, territory or sea
! scope="col" | Notes
|-
| style="background:#b0e0e6;" | 
! scope="row" style="background:#b0e0e6;" | Arctic Ocean
| style="background:#b0e0e6;" |
|-
| style="background:#b0e0e6;" | 
! scope="row" style="background:#b0e0e6;" | Lincoln Sea
| style="background:#b0e0e6;" |
|-
| 
! scope="row" | 
|Wulff Land
|-
| style="background:#b0e0e6;" | 
! scope="row" style="background:#b0e0e6;" | Sherard Osborn Fjord
| style="background:#b0e0e6;" |
|-valign="top"
| 
! scope="row" | 
| Passing through several fjords, the Nuussuaq Peninsula and Alluttoq Island
|-
| style="background:#b0e0e6;" | 
! scope="row" style="background:#b0e0e6;" | Disko Bay
| style="background:#b0e0e6;" |
|-
| 
! scope="row" | 
| Passing through several fjords
|-
| style="background:#b0e0e6;" | 
! scope="row" style="background:#b0e0e6;" | Atlantic Ocean
| style="background:#b0e0e6;" |
|-valign="top"
| 
! scope="row" | 
|-
| style="background:#b0e0e6;" | 
! scope="row" style="background:#b0e0e6;" | Atlantic Ocean
| style="background:#b0e0e6;" |
|-
| style="background:#b0e0e6;" | 
! scope="row" style="background:#b0e0e6;" | Southern Ocean
| style="background:#b0e0e6;" |
|-valign="top"
| 
! scope="row" | Antarctica
|-
|}

See also
50th meridian west
52nd meridian west

w051 meridian west